Sallyanne Payton is an American lawyer. She is the William W. Cook Professor Emerita of Law at the University of Michigan Law School. She was Stanford Law School's first African-American graduate.

Early life and education
Payton was born and raised in Los Angeles, California, to an insurance underwriter and schoolteacher. She earned her law degree from Stanford Law School in 1968, becoming their first African-American graduate. During her time at Stanford, Payton served as an editor of the Stanford Law Review.

Career

With her newly obtained law degree, Payton was hired at the law firm Covington & Burling in Washington, D.C. While there, she caught the attention of President Richard Nixon who hired her to sit on the White House Domestic Council staff in 1971. Her alma mater Stanford also elected her as an alumni-elect on their Board of Trustees. Payton was later appointed to Chief Counsel of the Urban Mass Transportation Administration at the U.S. Department of Transportation in 1973.

In 1976, Payton and Christina B. Whitman were hired full-time at the University of Michigan Law School. The following year, she was elected to Stanford's Board of Trustees for a five-year term. During the Clinton presidency, she served as an adviser for the Clinton Health Care Reform Task Force, which led to her election as a fellow of the National Academy of Public Administration.

On May 28, 2008, Payton was reappointed the William W. Cook Professor of Law until May 31, 2013. Two years later, she was elected to the National Academy of Social Insurance and a Senior Fellow of the Administrative Conference of the United States. In 2013, Payton officially retired from the University of Michigan Law School.

References

Living people
Lawyers from Los Angeles
Lawyers from Washington, D.C.
University of Michigan Law School faculty
Stanford Law School alumni
African-American women lawyers
African-American lawyers
Academic journal editors
Fellows of the United States National Academy of Public Administration
Year of birth missing (living people)
American women academics
21st-century African-American people
21st-century African-American women